State Route 247 (SR 247) is a  long east-west state highway in Maury and Williamson counties of Middle Tennessee.

Route description

SR 247 begins in Maury County at an intersection with SR 50 in Williamsport. It heads east through rural farmland and slightly hilly terrain, running parallel to the Duck River, to Santa Fe, where it has a short concurrency with SR 7. SR 247 the enters Spring Hill and passes along the northern edge of Spring Hill Manufacturing before passing through downtown, where it has an extremely short concurrency with US 31/SR 6. It then crosses into Williamson County and passes through subdivisions before leaving Spring Hill and crossing over I-65 without an interchange. The highway then passes through more wooded areas before entering Duplex and coming to an end at an intersection with US 431/SR 106.

Major intersections

References

247
Transportation in Maury County, Tennessee
Transportation in Williamson County, Tennessee